Jackie Marone is a fictional character in the CBS soap opera The Bold and the Beautiful, portrayed by British actress Lesley-Anne Down. She first appeared on April 1, 2003. In January 2012 it was confirmed that Down was not given a contract renewal, and would exit the show.

Storylines
Jackie came to town shortly after her son Nick moved to L.A. working for Lauren Fenmore and Fenmore's Department Stores and immediately set her sights on Eric Forrester. This put Jackie at odds with Eric's wife, Stephanie, from the start. When her son became involved with Brooke Logan, who was engaged to Ridge Forrester, Jackie didn't care and pushed Nick to pursue Brooke but this caused Jackie to meet her old lover and Ridge's father Massimo Marone. Jackie began to see Massimo and during a flight that crashed she admitted to Massimo that he was Nick's father and both realized that Frank Payne, her husband at the time, had deceived both of them into thinking that neither cared for the other and Massimo never knew about Nick. Only Jackie knew that Nick was Massimo's son. Jackie and Massimo soon got married and he planned a great future but Jackie continued to support Nick's pursuit of Brooke while Massimo was caught in the middle of the war over Brooke between Ridge and Nick. Brooke married Ridge and the two honeymooned in South America but Ridge and later Brooke and Nick were kidnapped by Sheila Carter. Massimo led a rescue mission but during a fight with Sheila's thugs Ridge was rescuing Brooke but he fell into a burning furnace and was thought to have died. Brooke was overcome with grief and Nick followed her and seduced her but Ridge survived and he returned to L.A. Brooke discovered she was pregnant. Unsure of who the father was, Brooke told Ridge about her night with Nick and took a paternity test that said Nick was the father. Jackie was overjoyed and even before Brooke left Ridge was planning his life with Brooke and the baby but the doctor soon told Jackie that there was a mistake with the test. Jackie kept this hidden from everyone but secretly ran a second test that revealed that Ridge was the father but Jackie still refused to tell anyone who the true father of the baby was for fear of Nick's relationship with Brooke ending. Eventually the truth came out as did Jackie's prior knowledge of the baby's paternity, which greatly strained her relationship with Nick and nearly destroyed her marriage to Massimo who had supported Nick's relationship with Brooke thinking Nick was the father. This caused Ridge to turn his back on Massimo and started a war between Ridge and Nick with Massimo caught in the middle and losing his eldest son Ridge. Around the same time Jackie began an affair with Deacon Sharpe and used him to conduct the second paternity test. The affair was soon discovered by Massimo who had a massive stroke as a result but with the help of his sons recovered.

Massimo embarked on a revenge plan against Deacon eventually driving Deacon back into alcoholism and rehab. Massimo divorced Jackie giving her a huge settlement including Jackie M Designs but after Brooke married Nick and Jackie continued to support the marriage, Massimo used his connections with the FBI in Washington D.C. to have Jackie arrested on false charges of tax evasion, money laundering, and tax fraud. Nick later convinced Massimo to release her but also was able to convince the Marone board to replace Massimo as CEO with Nick. Massimo soon left town while Jackie became involved again with Eric but he left her to marry Stephanie as their daughter Felicia's dying wish with the understanding that after Felicia died Eric would marry Jackie. However, Felicia miraculously survived and Eric chose to stay with Stephanie. This didn't mean that she and Stephanie got along.  The two women have squabbled numerous times, and recently, one of their arguments have landed Jackie in the hospital, in a coma.  (Jackie had fallen off the balcony in the Forrester house). This enraged her son, Nick, and with the help of Donna Logan, he wanted to make Stephanie pay for what she did to his mother. However, events have come forward that Jackie lied about how her accident happened; and also some shameful secrets from her past have come to light. It was discovered that she slept with several sea captains that worked for Marone Industries who came into Seattle for money when Nick was very young; Nick found that untenable, and as such disowned Jackie due to her having been a prostitute. With the help of the psychiatrist Taylor Hayes, Nick has since forgiven Jackie and they once again had a strong relationship. In an attempt to "shame" Nick and Jackie into returning the Forrester's company to them, Stephanie announced to all that Jackie was a former prostitute during the debut fashion show of "The New Nick-owned Forrester Creations." The plan backfired and Jackie garnered sympathy for having had to stoop so low to make a life for her and her son, particularly from Eric. Furious with Stephanie for sinking so low as to reveal such personal and damaging information about Jackie to the world, Eric continued to harbor resentment toward Stephanie and sympathy for Jackie. Jacqueline has taken advantage of Eric's vulnerability toward her and continuously (although unsuccessfully) attempts to seduce him away from Stephanie. It took Stephanie's sister, Pamela, to deflect one of Jackie's attempts to seduce Eric.

Jackie made a mistake of underestimating Pamela, and was thrown out. Despite the growing animosity between Nick and the Forresters, Jackie and Eric are still friendly with one another. But as of 2009, Stephanie and Jackie have become best friends. Stephanie became a partner with Jackie at Jackie M Designs helping get the company out of debt, and even becoming the number one fashion house in town beating Forrester Creations. After Stephanie left Jackie M Designs, she and Jackie remained closed. After an unsuccessful attempt at restarting the Brooke's Bedroom, Nick decided to sell Forrester Creations back to Eric, with one ultimatum—Stephanie may not be a part of the company. The sale was successful, and excluded the sale of Jackie M Boutiques, by which Jackie still owned. Clarke Garrison and her have recently begun a new venture by hoping to revitalize the Spectra Fashions label after Sally Spectra decided that she wanted to sell the company. Jackie hopes that she will be able to compete with the Forrester's better than ever, although she and Eric are still friends, as was evidenced when Eric invited her and Nick to the first fashion show since Eric got Forrester Creations back. Although Stephanie had them removed by security, (Eric found out and was furious with Stephanie for doing that) they still came back.  Recently, Jackie became a first time grandmother, when Nick and Taylor finally gave birth to their newborn son, Jack (named after her and Taylor's father). On a less happy note, she was one of the prime suspects in the shooting of Stephanie.  When she returned to Jackie M Designs (the former Spectra Fashions), she packed a bag hurriedly, and left town without any explanation.  Jackie was a suspect for a while for Stephanie Forrester's shooting but eventually the shooter was revealed to be Storm Logan. What she took from Forrester Creations while she was there has yet to be revealed.

Jackie hasn't been around much lately, she was gleefully present at her son's wedding to Bridget Forrester and most recently was seen visiting Eric Forrester in the hospital after he lapsed into a coma. She was a possible suspect in his poisoning but she was once again cleared when Pamela Douglas was revealed to be guilty of the crime. While standing in Eric's hospital room though she did say that if he had married her when he had the chance he wouldn't be in the position he's in now. Most recently Jacqueline's public appearances have included Jack's first birthday party, Ridge and Brooke's rehearsal dinner, Phoebe Forrester's memorial service and Forrester Creations Swim Line Fashion Show. Jackie's company was in danger of going bankrupt so she merged Jackie M Boutiques and M Fashions into one company called Jackie M Designs. She and Nick received all the designs from Forrester Creations newest line via e-mail by a person shrouded in mystery.  The mysterious contact asked in return to be made President of the company. That someone was Rick Forrester.  The situation appalled Forrester Creations; but Eric, in a show of fair play, allowed Jackie M. Designs to keep the line, since it was already out on the streets, in exchange for Rick not becoming president. Later on, though, his sister, Bridget, taking a leave of absence from the hospital, e-mailed her designs to Jackie, and she was so impressed that she hired her, however incognito as Madame X.  Later on, it was apparent that Bridget was working there, because Jackie clearly thinks that she and Nick should be together again, and thus has begun a rivalry with Nick's fiancée, Katie Logan, which is not unlike the rivalry her sisters had with Stephanie. In an ironic twist, Jackie and Nick hired their long-time nemesis, Stephanie Forrester at Jackie M. Designs, after she had been fired from Forrester Creations by her ex, Eric.  Due to Stephanie's contacts within the fashion industry, Jackie M. Designs is poised to get itself back to fiscal health.  This has also allowed Stephanie to bond closer with Jackie, and the two put aside their combative pasts and to become friends as well as develop a good professional relationship as well. Having recently hired Owen Knight, Jackie has started to date her chief of staff. Nick is appalled at the relationship, believing that Owen is simply after Jackie's money. In June 2009, after Jackie fired Owen, for Nick, Owen proposed and Jackie accepted. Nick is furious and vowed never to let his mother marry Owen. When Nick went on his honeymoon with Bridget in Hawaii, Owen bought two plane tickets to Hawaii himself, unaware that Nick and Bridget were also there.

The two couples had many near misses but Owen and Bridget eventually saw each other on the beach. They teamed up to make sure Nick and Jackie didn't know the other was in Hawaii. Owen planned a wedding for Jackie unbeknownst to Bridget. When Bridget realized that Owen was planning on marrying Jackie, she told Nick, who rushed out in order to prevent the wedding from going through. However, Nick arrived too late, and was left to see the happy couple driving off. Is it true love or has Jackie made the biggest mistake of her life? On a television talk show, however, Nick, Bridget, Whip and Jackie heard that Owen had declared that she was nothing but his "cougar fantasy woman" and then snidely told her on TV, that she'd been Punk'd.  This sent Jackie to the bottle and into Whip's apartment.  It was quickly revealed that the "Owen" on television was actually Owen's immature twin brother Casper Knight, who was determined to play a prank on Owen.  Jackie immediately forgave Owen, but the same couldn't be said for Owen after she confessed to kissing Whip.  It took Owen a while to accept what happened, but he eventually forgave his wife.  The two remain very much in love, despite the occasional rough spots. However their marriage is in real trouble now because of Owen cheating on Jackie by having a one-night stand with Bridget, which resulted in the birth of his & Bridget's son Logan on September 3, 2010. In October 2010, Rick Forrester, Bridget's older brother, makes his interest in Jackie known to her & begins pursuing her especially after Nick fired Jackie, Owen & Bridget from Jackie M Designs. Even though Jackie is interested, she makes it clear to Rick that she is married to Owen. Rick had no intention of giving up on her no matter what but realizes that it just wasn't worth it in the end. Jackie asked Owen to meet up with Bridget in Hawaii, where she enables Owen to realize his love for his son Logan and Bridget. Jackie sorrowfully asked Owen for a divorce, and Owen went to Bridget. In October 2011, Jackie moves closer again to Eric.

They share more kisses but in the end Eric chooses Stephanie and this has angered Jackie. In November 2011, Nick receives an anonymous message from a woman which says to meet him in the sauna of Jackie M When he discovers that it is Stephanie's sister, Pamela Douglas, he is shocked. Pam informs him of her break-up with Stephen and confesses to finding him (Nick) increasingly attractive. Nick rejects her advances, but Jackie makes a deal with Pam: in exchange for her getting to spend time with Nick, Pam agrees to steal some of the sketches from Eric.

Pam, who is very hopeful of getting the attention of Nick, goes to work at Forrester Creations, as a receptionist. Pam then took the opportunity to grab each design and handed them over to Nick and Jackie. Thanks to Pam, Jackie M was back in business. After the Jackie M collection is shown, the Forresters soon discover that Nick and Jackie stole their designs, and later discovered that Pam was behind it. In February 2012, Bridget and Owen announce their decision to split in order to allow Owen to return to his marriage with Jackie. Owen and Jackie reunite and declare their love for each other. Jackie moved to New York with Bridget and Logan to be with Owen's family.
In 2016, Bridget visited Brooke, Eric, Rick and Maya in LA.

References

The Bold and the Beautiful characters
Television characters introduced in 2003
Female characters in television
Fictional people in fashion